Do-won is a Korean masculine given name.  Its meaning differs based on the hanja used to write each syllable of the name. There are 44 hanja with the reading "do" and 35 hanja with the reading "won" on the South Korean government's list of hanja which may be registered for use in given names.

People with this name include:
Do Won Chang (born 1954), South Korean-born American businessman
Kwak Do-won (born 1982), South Korean actor 
 
Fictional characters with this name include:
Park Do-won, in 2008 South Korean film The Good, the Bad, the Weird

See also
List of Korean given names

References

Korean masculine given names